Malonga is a surname. Notable people with the surname include:

Chris Malonga (born 1987), French-born Congolese footballer
Désirée Malonga (born 1981), Romanian actress and model
Destin Onka Malonga (born 1988), Congolese footballer
Dominique Malonga (born 1989), French-born Congolese footballer
Jean Malonga (1907–1985), Republic of the Congo writer and politician
Kongo-language surnames

Surnames of Congolese origin